This is a list of flag bearers who have represented Italy at the Olympics.

Flag bearers carry the national flag of their country at the opening ceremony of the Olympic Games.

Summer Olympics

Winter Olympics

Notes

See also
Italy at the Olympics

References

Flagbearers
Italy
Flagbearers